Traffic Stop is a 2017 American documentary film directed by Kate Davis and David Heilbroner.

Summary
It chronicles a white police officer's stop and, ultimately, arrest of Breaion King, a 26-year-old African-American school teacher from Austin, Texas.

Accolades
The film was nominated for the Academy Award for Best Documentary Short Subject at the 90th Academy Awards. After airing on HBO, it was nominated for an Emmy for Outstanding Short Documentary at the 40th News and Documentary Emmy Award. It received generally positive reviews from critics.

References

External links
 
 Traffic Stop at HBO

2017 films
2017 short documentary films
American short documentary films
Austin, Texas
Documentary films about law enforcement in the United States
Documentary films about race and ethnicity in the United States
Law enforcement in Texas
HBO documentary films
2010s English-language films
Films directed by David Heilbroner
Films directed by Kate Davis
2010s American films